Rheinauen is a Verbandsgemeinde ("collective municipality") in the district Rhein-Pfalz-Kreis, in Rhineland-Palatinate, Germany. The seat of the Verbandsgemeinde is in Waldsee. Before 1 January 2016, the Verbandsgemeinde was named Waldsee.

The Verbandsgemeinde Rheinauen consists of the following Ortsgemeinden ("local municipalities"):

Altrip
Neuhofen
Otterstadt
Waldsee

Verbandsgemeinde in Rhineland-Palatinate